was a town located in Asakuchi District in the south-west of Okayama Prefecture, Japan. On March 21, 2006, Kamogata, along with the towns of Konkō and Yorishima (all from Asakuchi District), was merged to create the city of Asakuchi.

As of 2003, the town had an estimated population of 18,446 and a density of 506.20 persons per km². The total area was 36.44 km².

Geography 
Sandwiched between mountainous forests to the north and south, the central part of Kamogata remains relatively flat.

 Land area: 36.44 km2
 Population: 19,206 (As of 31 December 2004)
 Number of households: 6,42世帯 (As of 31 December 2004)

Topography 

 Mountains: Mt Youshou, Mt Chikurinji, Mt Abe, Mt Ryuuou
 Rivers: Kamogata River, Satomi River

Public Services 

 Kamogata Post Office
 Kamogata Townhouse Post Office (Renamed from Kamogata Honcho Post Office on 16 March 2004)
 Kanpo no Yado Mt Youshou
 Kasaoka District Association for Firefighting, Kamogata Fire Station
 Kamogata Water Treatment Plant
 Kamogata Purification Centre
 Kamogata Town Library

Education

Elementary schools 

 Kamogata-nishi Elementary School
 Kamogata-higashi Elementary School
 Rokujoin Elementary School

Junior high schools 

 Kamogata Junior High School

High schools 

 Kamogata High School　
 Okayama Sanyo School (No.1 Harada Gakuen Group)

Technical Colleges 

 Okayama Automobile Engineering College (No.1 Harada Gakuen Group)

Industry

Local Specialties 

 Kamogata Somen
 Kamogata Udon
 Bitchu Hiyamugi Noodles
 Japanese Sake
 Peaches
 Bouchan Pumpkin

Dissolved municipalities of Okayama Prefecture